Camel urine is a liquid by-product of metabolism in a camel's anatomy. Urine from camels has been used in the as prophetic medicine for centuries, being a part of ancient Bedouin practices. After the spread of MERS-CoV infections, the World Health Organization urged people to refrain from drinking "raw camel milk or camel urine or eating meat that has not been properly cooked".

Anatomy
Camel urine comes out as a thick syrup.

The kidneys and intestines of a camel are very efficient at reabsorbing water. Camels' kidneys have a 1:4 cortex to medulla ratio. Thus, the medullary part of a camel's kidney occupies twice as much area as a cow's kidney. Secondly, renal corpuscles have a smaller diameter, which reduces surface area for filtration. These two major anatomical characteristics enable camels to conserve water and limit the volume of urine in extreme desert conditions.

Each kidney of an Arabian camel has a capacity around 0.86 litres and can produce urine with high chloride concentrations. Like the horse, the dromedary has no gall bladder, an organ that requires water to function.  Consequently, bile flows constantly. Most food is digested and absorbed into the bloodstream from the small intestine. Any remaining liquids and roughage move into the large intestine.

Hadith on Camel Urine 
A hadith in Book 4 (Ablution) of al-Bukhari's collection narrated by Anas ibn Malik was used to promote the consumption of Arabian camel urine as a medicine. The Islamic prophet Muhammad is said to have advised some diseased people to use it "till their bodies became healthy".  The authentic hadith also states "Some people of ‘Ukl or ‘Uraina tribe came to Medina and its climate did not suit them ... So the Prophet ordered them to go to the herd of Milch camels and to drink their milk and urine (as a medicine). ... So they went as directed and after they became healthy". Bukhari also narrated, an otherwise identical version of this Hadith, without the mention of "urine". The event has also been recorded in Sahih Muslim, History of the Prophets and Kings and Kitāb aṭ-ṭabaqāt al-kabīr.

Indian Islamic scholar Mohammad Najeeb Qasmi notes various theories proposed by Hanafi and Shaafi’e scholars for a canonical understanding of the implications. This book refers to topical application of milch camel urine as the actual word of the saying has the word Azmadu which means to apply a layer of something. However, Bachtiar Nasir, an Islamic scholar, advocated for and defended the consumption of camel urine, claiming the mixture of camel urine and milk has medicinal benefits.

Medieval times 

Avicenna in The Canon of Medicine noted that a diet of camel milk and Arabian camel urine can be beneficial for diseases of the liver.

Usage and effects 
In Yemen, camel urine is consumed and used for treating ailments, though it has been widely denounced. Some salons are said use it as a treatment for hair loss. The camel urine from a virgin camel is priced at twenty dollars per liter, with herders saying that it has curative powers. It is traditionally mixed with milk.

In 2012, a study conducted at the Department of Molecular Oncology of King Faisal Specialist Hospital and Research Center, and published in the Journal of Ethnopharmacology, found that camel urine contains anti-cancerous agents that are cytotoxic against various, but not all, human cancer cell lines in vitro.

In 2017, a joint study by King Faisal University and University of Hong Kong found that experimental infections of dromedaries from with MERS‐CoV didn't show any evidence of virus in the urine. Therefore, the camel urine is an unlikely source of virus transmission to humans.

See also 
 Dromedaries
 Prophetic medicine
 Zoonosis

References 

Medicine in the medieval Islamic world
Urine
Camel products
Alternative medicine
Pseudoscience